RTL aktuell is a German television news programme broadcast on the commercial station RTL. The main 20-minute bulletin airs every evening at 18:45 CET, supplemented by a breakfast news bulletin (Punkt 6, Punkt 7, and Punkt 8 formerly Guten Morgen Deutschland), a lunchtime magazine programme (Punkt 12), a daily short news programme in the afternoon (RTL News) and a late night bulletin (RTL Nachtjournal). Weekend bulletins are branded as RTL aktuell Weekend.

RTL aktuell was launched in 1988 as the direct replacement for 7 vor 7, and since 11 September 2010 it is broadcast in HD.

Presenters

Correspondent 
 Antonia Rados (Chief international correspondent)

Awards 
In 2007, RTL aktuell won the Deutscher Fernsehpreis (German TV award) in the category of Beste Informationssendung (Best News Broadcast).

Market share 
Market shares of RTL aktuell in the target audience of 14 to 49-years-old:

External links

Official website

German television news shows
Television shows set in Cologne
1988 German television series debuts
1990s German television series
2000s German television series
2010s German television series
German-language television shows
RTL (German TV channel) original programming